The Order of the Red Banner of Labour was an order of the Soviet Union established to honour great deeds and services to the Soviet state and society in the fields of production, science, culture, literature, the arts, education, sports, health, social and other spheres of labour activities. It is the labour counterpart of the military Order of the Red Banner. A few institutions and factories, being the pride of Soviet Union, also received the order. The Order of the Red Banner of Labour was the third-highest civil award in the Soviet Union, after the Order of Lenin and the Order of the October Revolution.

The Order of the Red Banner of Labour began solely as an award of the Russian SFSR on December 28, 1920. The all-Union equivalent was established by Decree of the Presidium of the Supreme Soviet on September 7, 1928, and approved by another decree on September 15, 1928. The Order's statute and regulations were modified by multiple successive decrees of the Presidium of the Supreme Soviet of the USSR, on May 7, 1936, on June 19, 1943, on March 28, 1980, and on July 18, 1980.

Award statute
The Order of the Red Banner of Labour can be awarded to citizens of the USSR, to businesses, associations, institutions, organizations, and allied autonomous republics, territories, autonomous regions, districts, cities and other localities; it may also be awarded to persons who are not citizens of the USSR, as well as to enterprises, institutions and organizations located in foreign countries:
for great achievements in the development of industry, agriculture, farming, construction, transport and other sectors of the economy, to improve the efficiency of social production;
for the highest growth rates in labour productivity, improved product quality, development and introduction of more advanced manufacturing processes;
for consistently high results in the implementation and overfulfillment of planned assignments and socialist obligations undertaken;
for major advances in increasing the productivity of agricultural crops and the productivity of livestock breeding, increasing manufacturing output and sales of state agricultural products;
for contributions in the development of science and technology, the introduction of the latest achievements in the national economy, for inventions and innovations which are of great technical – economic significance;
for contributions in strengthening national defense;
for very fruitful activities in Soviet culture, literature and the arts;
for contributions in education and communist political education to the younger generations, in highly specialised training, health, trade, catering, housing, utilities, housing, public services;
for special achievements in the development of physical culture and Sports;
for important achievements in the field of state and public activities, the strengthening of socialist legality and the rule of law;
for great achievements in economic, scientific, technical and cultural cooperation between the USSR and other states.

The Order of the Red Banner of Labour could be awarded multiple times to the same recipient for successive deeds and long time merit.

The Order of the Red Banner of Labour was worn on the left side of the chest and in the presence of other awards of the USSR, was located immediately after the Order of the Red Banner. If worn in the presence of Orders or medals of the Russian Federation, the latter have precedence.

Award description
The design of the Order of the Red Banner of Labour evolved over the years. Its original design, called "type 1" was amended in 1936, this new variant will be identified as "type 2".

Type 1
The "type 1" Order consisted of a 38 mm wide by 43 mm high silver badge in the shape of a cogwheel, at center, a disc bordered along its entire outer diameter by panicles of wheat. Protruding from under the lower half of the central disc, a red enamelled triangle pointing downwards. On the central disc in the background, a hydro electric dam, at center, a gilded hammer and sickle, at the top, a waving red banner bearing the inscription "Proletarians of the World, unite!". At the very bottom of the cogwheel, the relief inscription "USSR" on a stylised horizontal shield bisected by a smaller cogwheel meshing into the larger one. On the otherwise plain reverse, a recess at center bearing a threaded post, two rivets used to secure the hammer and sickle and the award serial number engraved on the lower portion opposite the "USSR" inscription. The Order was secured to clothing with a threaded screw and nut arrangement. The earlier nuts were 28 mm in diameter, later ones measured 32 mm.

Type 2
The "type 2" Order also consisted of a silver badge in the shape of a cogwheel, it measured 38 mm wide by 44 mm high. On the lower circumference of the cogwheel, the relief inscription "Proletarians of the World, unite!", below the cogwheel, a red enamelled relief five pointed star superimposed on a shield from which four short panicles of wheat protrude left and right. At the center, a disc surrounded by a gilded wreath of oak leaves bearing the relief image of a hydro electric dam, below the dam, blue enamelled water, at the center of the disc, the gilded hammer and sickle, from the inner left side of the disc, a gilded mast bearing a waving red enamelled banner protruding from the central disc, covering the upper portion of the cogwheel and protruding past its outer upper edge on which "USSR" is inscribed in gilded letters. Along the outer circumference of the central disc's wreath, white enamelled slots spaced equally on the cogwheel. On the otherwise plain reverse, a concave recess at center bearing a threaded post, eight rivets (only three rivets on the post 1943 variant) used to secure the various parts to the badge and the award serial number engraved on the lower portion below the recess. The Order was secured to clothing with a threaded screw and a 33 mm in diameter nut until 1943 when it was secured by a ring through the medal suspension loop to a pentagonal mount covered by an overlapping 24 mm wide light blue silk moiré ribbon with 4 mm wide dark blue edge stripes.

Recipients (partial list)
The individuals listed below were recipients of the Order of the Red Banner of Labour.

The first recipient of the Order of the Red Banner of Labour of the RSFSR was Nikita Menchukov for saving an important bridge from being destroyed by flowing ice.

Order of the Red Banner of Labour of the USSR number 1 was presented to the Putilov (later Kirov) Works in Leningrad. The first individual awardees were V. Fedetov, A. Shelagin and M. Kyatkovsky for the rescue of a polar expedition.

Mikhail Gorbachev received the Order of the Red Banner of Labour for harvesting a record crop on his family's collective farm in 1949 at age 17, an honor which was very rare for someone so young. He is one of the Order's youngest recipients.

Six-time recipients
Nikolay Maksimovich Belyaev, founder and head of the optical industry
Nikolay Stepanovich Beznosov, deputy minister of Defense Industry of the USSR
Mikhail Aleksandrovich Brezhnev, engineer
Makar Fyodorovich Goryainov, general
Alexander Konstantinovich Protazanov, first secretary of the East Kazakhstan Party organisation
Nikolay Nicholaevich Smelyakov, Minister of General Machine Building of the USSR, director of the factory "Red Sormovo"
Leonid Nikolaevich Solovyev, politician
Aleksey Ivanovich Sorokin, politician
Suleyman Azad oğlu Vazirov, Minister of Oil Industry in the Azerbaijani SSR

Five-time recipients
Arnold Green, Soviet diplomat, Party and State figure
Mikhail Alexandrovich Leontovich, physicist and academician
Gennady Vasilevich Alekseenko, a specialist in the field of energy
Aleksandr Fedorovich Belov, metallurgy academician
Pavel Semyonovich Vlasov, Hero of Socialist Labour, director of the Novosibirsk Chemical Concentrates Plant
Leonid Efimovich Grafov, Deputy Minister of the Coal Industry
Ivan Timofeevich Grishin, Deputy Minister of Foreign Trade
Nikolai Alekseevich Gundobin, Hero of Socialist Labour, 1st Deputy Minister of Transport of the USSR
Aleksandr Viktorovich Dokukin, Corresponding Member of the USSR Academy of Sciences
Leonid Fedorovich Ilichev, secretary of the CPSU Central Committee
Vladimir Alekseevich Karlov, Hero of Socialist Labour, department head of the CPSU Central Committee
Boris Vasilevich Kurchatov, doctor of chemical sciences
Pavel Andreevich Maletin, Deputy Minister of Finance of the USSR (1939–1945, 1960–1969)
Konstantin Dmitrievich Petukhov, Hero of Socialist Labour, General Director of PEMSO "Dynamo"
Rasizade, Shamil Alievich, deputy prime-minister of Azerbaijan SSR (1970–1984)
Aleksey Vladimirovich Romanov, editor of the newspaper "Soviet Culture"
Ivan Dmitrievich Sosnov, Minister of Transport Construction of the USSR
Tamara Khanum, People's Artist of USSR (1956), Uzbek dancer
Konstantin Chibisov, Corresponding Member of USSR Academy of Sciences (1946)

Four-time recipients
Rasul Gamzatovich Gamzatov, poet
Levko Mykolajovych Revutskyi, composer, teacher, and activist
Sabit Atayevich Orujev, Deputy Prime-minister of Azerbaijan SSR (1957–1959)
Andrey Melitonovich Balanchivadze, composer
Augusts Eduardovich Voss, politician and party functionary
Natalia Mikhailovna Dudinskaya, prima ballerina
Eugen Arturovich Kapp, composer and music educator
Patriarch Alexy I, patriarch of the Russian Orthodox Church
Galina Sergeyevna Ulanova, prima ballerina

Three-time recipients
Konstantin Ustinovich Chernenko, fifth General Secretary of the Communist Party of the Soviet Union
Yuri Vladimirovich Andropov, fourth General Secretary of the Communist Party of the Soviet Union
Alexander Naumovich Frumkin, electrochemist, Hero of Socialist Labour
Alexander Nikolaevich Yakovlev, politician and historian
Grigory Naumovich Chukhray, film director and screenwriter
Sopubek Begalievich Begaliev, politician
Matvey Alkunovich Kapelyushnikov, mechanical engineer, Hero of Socialist Labour
Georgy Nikolayevich Flyorov, nuclear physicist
Boris Borisovich Pyotrovsky, academician, historian-orientalist and archaeologist
Isaak Markovich Khalatnikov, physicist
Max Arkadyevich Taitz, scientist in aerodynamics, theory of jet engines and flight testing of aircraft, one of the founders of the Gromov Flight Research Institute, recipient of the Stalin Prize (1949 and 1953), Honoured Scientist of the RSFSR

Two-time recipients
Andrey Nikolayevich Tupolev, aircraft designer
Konstantin Petrovich Feoktistov, cosmonaut and eminent space engineer
Aram Ilyich Khachaturian, composer
Ginzburg, Vitaly Lazarevich, theoretical physicist, astrophysicist, Nobel laureate
 Kollontai, Alexandra Mikhailovna, first female government minister in Europe, one of the first female diplomats in modern times
Khrennikov, Tikhon Nikolayevich, composer and pianist
Klavdiya Sergeevna Kildsheva, aviation engineer and Hero of Socialist Labor

Yakov Borisovich Zeldovich, physicist
Nikolai Ivanovich Ryzhkov, politician
Irina Konstantinovna Rodnina, Olympic gold medalist figure skater
Züleyxa Seyidməmmədova, fighter pilot
Ilyushin, Vladimir Sergeyevich, test pilot
Yuli Mikhailovich Vorontsov diplomat and ambassador
Arkady Ilyich Ostashev laureate of the Lenin and state prizes of the, senior test pilot of missiles and space-rocket complexes of OKB-1, the disciple and companion of Sergei Pavlovich Korolev.
Dimitry Dmitrievich Venediktov Deputy Health Minister of the USSR
Shamama Hasanova, Azerbaijani cotton producer and politician.
Kim Pen Hwa, collective farm manager
Aleksey Vasilievich Shubnikov crystallographer

Single awards
 Leila Abashidze, actor and writer
 Alisa Aksyonova, museum director
 Pavel Alexandrov, mathematician
 Araxie Babayan, chemist
 Fyokla Bezzubova, folklore writer
 Kateryna Boloshkevich, weaver and statesperson
 Mariya Borodayevskaya, geologist
 Lyudmila Byakova, seamstress
 Viktor Stepanovich Chernomyrdin, Prime Minister of Russia (1992–1998)
 Clementine Churchill
 Ilya Devin, writer
 Valentina Dimitrieva, farm worker
 Glafira Dorosh, chef, the only recipient of a Soviet order for a recipe
 Lev Dyomin, cosmonaut
 Lydia Fotiyeva, personal secretary of Vladimir Lenin
 Ivan Gevorkian, prominent Soviet Armenian surgeon and scientist
 Äxmät İsxaq, Tatar poet and translator
 Anatoly Karpov, World Chess Champion
 Faina Kotkowa, weaver
 Valentina Khetagurova (1914–1992), founder of the Khetagurovite Campaign
 Marcus Klingberg, Israeli scientist and Soviet spy
 Boris Kozo-Polyansky, botanist and evolutionary biologist.
 Jack Littlepage, US mining expert and Soviet Deputy Commissar
 Vladimir Lobashev, physicist
 Mikhail Mil, aerospace engineer
 Mariya Orlyk, teacher and politician
 Sergei Orlov, sculptor and painter
 Nicolay Paskevich, painter
 Ivan Poddubny, professional wrestler
 Vladimir Rvachev, mathematician
 Yevgeny Primakov, Speaker of the Soviet of the Union of the Supreme Soviet of the Soviet Union
 Leonid Rogozov, physician who took part in the sixth Soviet Antarctic Expedition in 1960–1961
 Arnold Rüütel, ex-president of Estonia
 Nikolay Semyonov, physicist and chemist
 Yuri Levitan, Soviet radio announcer
 Lyudmila Shevtsova – athlete, Olympic champion and 800 m world record holder
 Mikhail Shuisky, opera singer
 Vasily Shukshin, actor, writer, screenwriter and film director
 Alexander Yakovlev, aeronautical engineer
 Alexander Yanshin, geologist
 Yevgeny Yevtushenko, poet, novelist, essayist, dramatist, screenwriter, actor, editor, and film director
 Melita Stedman Norwood Spy USSR - Work 1930-1972.
 Hugh Lincoln Cooper American Engineer
 Olga Avilova, surgeon
 Barno Itzhakova, Shashmaqam folk singer
 Sergi Jikia, Georgian historian and orientalist, founder of the Turkology in Georgia.
 Nina Pigulevskaya, Soviet historian and orientalist.
 Leonid Kirensky, physicist
 Boris Miller, Iranianist scholar

Institutions, organisations, localities
Komsomol
Vilnius University
City of Kovrov
Saint Petersburg State University
City of Mykolaiv
City of Podolsk
Bolshevichka clothes factory
Zvyazda state newspaper
East Siberian Railway
National Library of Russia
Kuban State University of Technology
Moscow State University of Fine Chemical Technologies
8th Soviet Rifle Division
Kamensk-Uralsky Metallurgical Works, in 1978
Sovetskaya Entsiklopediya
Trolza trolleybus factory
Ural State Medical University
Uraltransmash
Yerevan State University

See also

Orders, decorations, and medals of the Soviet Union
Orders, decorations, and medals of the Soviet Republics
Order of the Red Banner

References

Works cited

External links
 Legal Library of the USSR
 The Russian Gazette

Awards established in 1920
Awards established in 1928
Awards disestablished in 1991
Red Banner of Labor, Order of the
1920 establishments in Russia
1928 establishments in the Soviet Union
1991 disestablishments in the Soviet Union